Below are the squads for the men's football tournament at the 2002 Asian Games, played in Busan, South Korea.

Since 2002 male competitors have been required to be under 23 years old, and a maximum of three over-23-year-old players have been allowed per squad. Overage players are marked with *.

Group A

Malaysia
Coach:  Allan Harris

Maldives
Coach:  Jozef Jankech

Oman
Coach: Rashid Jaber

South Korea
Coach: Park Hang-seo

Group B

Thailand
Coach:  Peter Withe

United Arab Emirates
Coach:  Roy Hodgson

Vietnam
Coach:  Christian Letard

Yemen
Coach:  Mahmoud Abou-Regaila

Group C

Bangladesh
Coach:  György Kottán

China
Coach: Shen Xiangfu

India
Coach:  Stephen Constantine

Turkmenistan
Coach:  Volodymyr Bezsonov

Group D

Bahrain
Coach:  Wolfgang Sidka

Japan
Coach: Masakuni Yamamoto

Palestine
Coach:  Andrzej Wiśniewski

Uzbekistan
Coach: Viktor Borisov

Group E

Afghanistan
Coach: Mir Ali Asghar Akbarzada

Iran
Coach:  Branko Ivanković

Lebanon
Coach:  Richard Tardy

Qatar
Coach:  Alex Dupont

Group F

Hong Kong
Coach: Lai Sun Cheung

Kuwait
Coach:  Radojko Avramović

North Korea
Coach: Ri Jong-man

Pakistan
Coach:  Joseph Herel

References

2002 Asian Games Report

External links
Official website

2002
Squads